Cepeleuți is a commune in Edineț District, Moldova. It is composed of three villages: Cepeleuți, Rîngaci and Vancicăuți.

Notable people
 Victor Teleucă 
 Nicolai Lupan 
 Gheorghe Ciocoi 
 Ion Morei

References

Communes of Edineț District